Phyllognathus is a genus of beetles belonging to the family Scarabaeidae, subfamily Dynastinae.

The species of this genus are found in Southern Europe, Northern Africa.

Species:

Phyllognathus degener 
Phyllognathus dionysius 
Phyllognathus excavatus 
Phyllognathus orion 
Phyllognathus sabatinellii

References

Dynastinae